Shahriston is a village and jamoat in north-west Tajikistan. It is located in Shahriston District in the central part of Sughd Region. It is the administrative center of Shahriston District. The jamoat has a total population of 22,903 (2015). It consists of 12 villages, including Shahriston (the seat), Buston, Chashmasor, Firdavsi, Istiqlol, Tursunzoda and Vahdat.

The archaeological site of Bunjikat is located nearby.

References

Populated places in Sughd Region
Jamoats of Tajikistan